Dave McClain (January 28, 1938 – April 28, 1986) was an American football player and coach. He served as the head coach at Ball State University from 1971 to 1977 and at the University of Wisconsin–Madison from 1978 to 1985, compiling a career college football record of 92–67–6.

Playing career
A native of Upper Sandusky, Ohio, McClain was a 1956 graduate of Upper Sandusky High School and a 1960 graduate of Bowling Green State University, where he played both quarterback and safety.  As a basketball player for Upper Sandusky, McClain held the career-scoring record from 1956 through 1982 with 1079 points.

Coaching career
McClain started his coaching career at Crestline High School in Ohio with an 8–1 record and then returned to Bowling Green as a graduate assistant in 1961, where he served as freshmen offensive coach. He then served as an assistant coach at Cornell University under Tom Harp in 1962; at Miami University under Bo Schembechler, 1963–1966; at the University of Kansas under Pepper Rodgers, 1967–1968; and at Ohio State University under Woody Hayes in 1969–1970 before accepting the head coaching job at Ball State.

During his seven seasons at Ball State, McClain compiled a 46–25–3 (.642) record. During his tenure, Ball State joined Division I and the Mid-American Conference (MAC). He was the MAC Coach of the Year in 1975. The 1976, team captured the school's first MAC title in only its second year in the conference.

Following his successful run at Ball State, McClain was hired as the head football coach at the University of Wisconsin–Madison, where he served from 1978 to 1985.  During his tenure he compiled a 46–42–3 (.522) record, including a 1–2 record in post-season bowl games.  He led the Badgers to back to back seven-win seasons in 1981 and 1982.  McClain was the first coach in Badger football history to win the first four games of his head coaching tenure at Wisconsin. He also recorded Wisconsin football's first post-season bowl victory, a 14–3 win over the Kansas State Wildcats in the 1982 Independence Bowl.

Death and honors
McClain's coaching career was cut short when he died on April 28, 1986 of cardiac arrest. He was 48 years of age.

Following his death, he was inducted into the Bowling Green State University Athletic Hall of Fame in 1986. He was inducted into the Ball State University Athletic Hall of Fame in 1990.  Also, the Dave McClain Athletic Facility at the University of Wisconsin–Madison was named in his memory. In 1986, the Big Ten Conference dedicated its football Coach of the Year award in honor of McClain. In 2011, McClain was inducted into UW's Athletic Hall of Fame.

Head coaching record

College

References

External links
 

1938 births
1986 deaths
American football quarterbacks
American football safeties
Ball State Cardinals football coaches
Bowling Green Falcons football coaches
Bowling Green Falcons football players
Cornell Big Red football coaches
Kansas Jayhawks football coaches
Miami RedHawks football coaches
Ohio State Buckeyes football coaches
Wisconsin Badgers football coaches
High school football coaches in Ohio
People from Upper Sandusky, Ohio
Coaches of American football from Ohio
Players of American football from Ohio